Viduthalai is a 1954 Indian Tamil-language crime drama film directed and produced by K. Ramnoth. It was adapted from the play The First and the Last by John Galsworthy. The film stars V. Nagayya and Manohar. It was released on 12 February 1954 and failed at the box office.

Plot 
Periaswamy, a crooked lawyer, tries to get his brother Chellaiah off a murder charge by framing Murugan, a horse carriage driver. Overcome with guilt, Chellaiah donates the money he wins in a lottery to Murugan and confesses to his crime in a letter before committing suicide. Periaswamy burns the letter, believing it will affect his chances of being promoted to judge, but the police arrest him, thinking he committed double murder.

Cast 
 V. Nagayya as Periaswamy
 Manohar as Chellaiah
 T. V. Kumudhini as Chellaiah's wife
 Peer Mohammed as Murugan
 Nott Annaji Rao as the judge

Production 
Viduthalai was adapted from the play The First and the Last by John Galsworthy, and was the inaugural production of New Era Productions. Cinematography was handled by Babulnath Walke, and the editing by Paul G. Yadav. K. Ramnoth directed the film, which was produced by G. Ramakrishnan.

Soundtrack 
The music was composed by Lakshman Raghunath, and the lyrics were written by Subbu Arumugam, Velavan and Angamangalam Kuppu.

Release and reception 
Viduthalai was released on 12 February 1954, and was distributed by Subbu & Co. The film failed commercially, jeopardising Ramnoth in the process.

References

Bibliography

External links 

1950s Tamil-language films
1954 crime drama films
1954 films
Fictional portrayals of the Tamil Nadu Police
Films about organised crime in India
Films directed by K. Ramnoth
Films set in 1954
Films set in Chennai
Indian black-and-white films
Indian crime drama films
Indian films based on plays